Furfuryl alcohol is an organic compound containing a furan substituted with a hydroxymethyl group. It is a colorless liquid, but aged samples appear amber. It possesses a faint odor of burning and a bitter taste. It is miscible with but unstable in water. It is soluble in common organic solvents.

Synthesis
Furfuryl alcohol is manufactured industrially by hydrogenation of furfural, which is itself typically produced from waste bio-mass such as corncobs or sugar cane bagasse. As such furfuryl alcohol may be considered a green chemical. One-pot systems have been investigated to produce furfuryl alcohol directly from xylose using solid acid catalysts.

Reactions
It undergoes many reactions including Diels-Alder additions to electrophilic alkenes and alkynes. Hydroxymethylation gives 1,5-bis(hydroxymethyl)furan. Hydrolysis gives levulinic acid. Upon treatment with acids, heat and/or catalysts, furfuryl alcohol can be made to polymerize into a resin, poly(furfuryl alcohol). Hydrogenation of furfuryl alcohol can proceed to give hydroxymethyl derivative of tetrahydrofuran and 1,5-pentanediol. The etherification reaction of furfuryl alcohol with alkyl or aryl halide (e.g. benzyl chloride) in the liquid-liquid-liquid triphase system with the help of a phase transfer catalyst also reported. In the Achmatowicz reaction, also known as the Achmatowicz rearrangement, furfuryl alcohol is converted to a dihydropyran.

Applications

Resins, composites
The primary use of furfuryl alcohol is as a monomer for the synthesis of furan resins. These polymers are used in thermoset polymer matrix composites, cements, adhesives, coatings and casting/foundry resins. Polymerization involves an acid-catalyzed polycondensation, usually giving a black cross-linked product. A highly simplified representation is shown below.

Because of its low molecular weight, furfuryl alcohol can impregnate the cells of wood, where it can be polymerized and bonded with the wood by heat, radiation, and/or catalysts or additional reactants. The treated wood (e.g. "Kebony") has improved moisture-dimensional stability, hardness, and decay and insect resistance; catalysts can include zinc chloride, citric, and formic acid, as well as borates.

Use as rocket propellant (fuel component)
Furfuryl alcohol has been used in rocketry as a fuel which ignites hypergolically (immediately and energetically in contact) with white fuming nitric acid or red fuming nitric acid oxidizer. The use of hypergolics avoids the need for an igniter. In late 2012, Spectra, a concept liquid rocket engine using white fuming nitric acid as the oxidizer to furfuryl alcohol fuel was static tested by Copenhagen Suborbitals.

Safety
The median lethal dose for furfuryl alcohol ranges from 160 to 400 mg/kg (mouse or rabbit, oral).

See also
Furfurylamine - corresponding amine
2-Furonitrile - corresponding nitrile
Furan-2-ylmethanethiol - corresponding thiol
2-Furoic acid - corresponding carboxylic acid

References

External links
Health hazards 
CDC - NIOSH Pocket Guide to Chemical Hazards
Literature: K.J. Zeitsch,The Chemistry and Technology of Furfural and its Many By-Products, Elsevier, 2000

2-Furyl compounds
Hydroxymethyl compounds
Rocket fuels
Alcohol solvents